This is the complete list of Asian Games medalists in cycling from 1951 to 2018.

BMX

Men's race

Women's race

Mountain bike

Men's cross-country

Men's downhill

Women's cross-country

Women's downhill

Road

Men's road race

Men's open road race

Men's individual time trial

Men's team road race

Men's team time trial

Women's road race

Women's individual time trial

Men's track

Sprint

1 km time trial

Keirin

Individual pursuit

Points race

800 m mass start

1600 m mass start

4800 m mass start

10000 m mass start

Omnium

Tandem

Madison

Team sprint

1600 m team time trial

Team pursuit

Women's track

Sprint

500 m time trial
 In 1990, 1 km time trial

Keirin

Individual pursuit

Points race

Omnium

Madison

Team sprint

Team pursuit

References

Medalists Road
Medalists Track

Cycling Road Track BMX Mountain Bike
medalists